The Italian Chapel is a highly ornate Catholic chapel on Lamb Holm in the Orkney Islands. It was built during World War II by Italian prisoners of war, who were housed on the previously uninhabited island while they constructed the Churchill Barriers to the east of Scapa Flow. Only the concrete foundations of the other buildings of the prisoner-of-war camp survive. The chapel was not completed until after the end of the war, and was restored in the 1960s and again in the 1990s. It is a popular tourist attraction, and a category A listed building.

It is in the Roman Catholic Parish of Our Lady & St Joseph in Orkney, part of the Roman Catholic Diocese of Aberdeen. Mass is held in the chapel on the first Sunday of the summer months (April–September).

Construction 

550 Italian prisoners of war, captured in North Africa during World War II, were brought to Orkney in 1942. They worked on the construction of the Churchill Barriers, four causeways created to block access to Scapa Flow. 200 were based at Camp 60 on Lamb Holm. In 1943, Major Thomas Pyres Buckland, Camp 60's new commandant, and Father Gioacchino Giacobazzi, the camp's Catholic priest, agreed that a place of worship was required.

The chapel was constructed from limited materials by the prisoners in the form of a tin tabernacle, and comprises two Nissen huts joined end-to-end. The corrugated interior was then covered with plasterboard and the altar and altar rail were constructed from concrete left over from work on the barriers. Most of the interior decoration was done by Domenico Chiocchetti, a prisoner from Moena. He painted the sanctuary end of the chapel and fellow-prisoners decorated the entire interior. They created a facade out of concrete, concealing the shape of the hut and making the building look like a church. The light holders were made out of corned beef tins. The baptismal font was made from the inside of a car exhaust covered in a layer of concrete.

When his fellow prisoners were released shortly before the end of the war, Chiocchetti remained on the island to finish decorating the newly consecrated chapel.

Preservation 

In 1958, the Chapel Preservation Committee was set up by a group of Orcadians. In 1960, Chiocchetti returned to assist in the restoration. He returned again in 1964, with Mrs Maria Chiocchetti, but he was too ill to travel when some of the other prisoners returned in 1992 to commemorate the fiftieth anniversary of their arrival on the island. He died in 1999. In 1996, a declaration was jointly signed by officials in Orkney and Chiocchetti's hometown of Moena, reinforcing the ties between the two places.

The chapel is still used for worship and remains a popular tourist attraction, receiving over 100,000 visitors every year. It has become one of the best-known symbols of reconciliation in the British Isles.

Philip Paris wrote two books, one fiction and one non-fiction, about the building of the chapel. The novel The Chapel at the Edge of the World by Kirsten Mckenzie covers the chapel's building.

In 2014, a special Mass was held at the chapel to mark its 70th anniversary. During the Mass, Angela Chiocchetti, the daughter of Domenico Chiocchetti, sang Panis angelicus.

In 2015, professional art restorer Antonella Papa offered and had her services accepted to restore the chapel's frescoes, spending a month on the work. She continued this work with the help of local volunteers at the end of October 2017.

Architectural details

See also 
 Pietermaritzburg Italian P.O.W. Church

References

External links 

 
 Orkney’s Italian Chapel

Roman Catholic churches completed in 1943
Category A listed buildings in Orkney
Listed Roman Catholic churches in Scotland
Roman Catholic chapels in Scotland
Churches in Orkney
Italy in World War II
United Kingdom home front during World War II
1943 establishments in Scotland
Italian diaspora in the United Kingdom
Foreign relations of Scotland
Scotland in World War II
20th-century Roman Catholic church buildings in the United Kingdom